A Peruvian postal code (Peruvian Spanish: codigo postal) is a five-digit string that comprises part of a postal address in Peru. Prior to 2011, only the major cities of Lima and Callao used postal codes. However, in February 2011 a nationwide system was implemented which employs a five-digit numeric format. Similar to the postal codes of Mexico, Brazil, Australia, the United States, and elsewhere, postal codes in Peru are strictly numerical, using only numbers.

The first two digits of the postal code identify the administrative region or department, whereas the final two digits represents a specific district or location within a district. The middle  digit does not strictly relate to specific provinces, therefore it is possible and indeed common for one province to be split amongst multiple postal zones.

For example, the province of Chachapoyas contains portions of postal zones 010, 012, 013 and 014 whereas postal zone 011 is entirely within Bongará Province. Regardless, it can be understood that all five postal zones are within the Department of Amazonas, since they all begin with the digits 01.

An online tool to search for postal codes can be found here.

Postal codes 
The following chart lists the various postal codes in use throughout Peru. Each department or region is assigned a two-digit regional code. This makes up the beginning of the postal code. The final two digits comprise a geographic code which denotes a specific district or area within a district. The middle digit is not tied to administrative boundaries. Final digits other than "0" or "5" tend to denote urban or built-up areas, though this is not always the case.

Therefore, the postal code for the district of Jazan, in the Amazones Region, is 01130, whereas the postal code for the city of Pedro Ruiz Gallo within Jazan district, is 01131.

Similarly, while the district of Conchuccos has the postal code 02875, the urban city of the same name uses the postal code 02876. 

<div style =display:inline-table>

Historical postal codes 
The historical list of postal codes from Lima and Callao is shown below. As of February 2011, these codes are no longer in use.

Lima 
Lima 01 = Cercado
Lima 02 = Ancon
Lima 03 = Ate
Lima 04 = Barranco
Lima 05 = Breña
Lima 06 = Carabayllo
Lima 07 = Comas
Lima 08 = Chaclacayo
Lima 09 = Chorrillos
Lima 10 = El agustino
Lima 11 = Jesús María
Lima 12 = La Molina
Lima 13 = La Victoria
Lima 14 = Lince
Lima 15 = Lurigancho
Lima 16 = Lurin
Lima 17 = Magdalena
Lima 18 = Miraflores
Lima 19 = Pachacamac
Lima 20 = Pucusana
Lima 21 = Pueblo Libre
Lima 22 = Puente Piedra
Lima 23 = Punta Negra
Lima 24 = Punta Hermosa
Lima 25 = Rimac
Lima 26 = San Bartolo
Lima 27 = San Isidro
Lima 28 = Independencia
Lima 29 = San Juan de Miraflores
Lima 30 = San Luis
Lima 31 = San Martin de Porres
Lima 32 = San Miguel
Lima 33 = Santiago de Surco
Lima 34 = Surquillo
Lima 35 = Villa María del Triunfo
Lima 36 = San Juan de Lurigancho
Lima 37 = Santa María del Mar
Lima 38 = Santa Rosa
Lima 39 = Los Olivos
Lima 40 = Cieneguilla
Lima 41 = San Borja
Lima 42 = Villa el Salvador
Lima 43 = Santa Anita

Callao 
CALLAO 01 : Callao District
CALLAO 02 : Bellavista
CALLAO 03 : Carmen de la Legua Reynoso
CALLAO 04 : La Perla
CALLAO 05 : La Punta
CALLAO 06 : Ventanilla

External links 
 - National Postal Code - Peru (in Spanish)
 - Oficial Postal Code Search - Ministry of Transport and Communications of Peru
 - Ministry of Transport and Communications announces new Postal Code system in Peru (in Spanish)
Peru Postal Code Lookup and Maps

Peru
Postal codes
Postal system of Peru